John Elliott (born June 22, 1984) is an American electronic musician from Cleveland, Ohio. A former member of Emeralds, Elliott has been involved in a number of solo projects and collaborations including Imaginary Softwoods, Mist (with Sam Goldberg), and Outer Space (with Andrew Veres). Elliott also curates the electronic music label Spectrum Spools, as well as Wagon, a label he set up with Emeralds guitarist, Mark McGuire. In 2016, Elliott won the Cleveland Arts Prize for Emerging Artist. 

Elliott's music is synthesizer-based covering experimental, psychedelic, drone and ambient genres.

References 

Musicians from Cleveland
1984 births
Living people
Place of birth missing (living people)